Alois Reicht (25 April 1928 – 4 November 2022) was an Austrian  and politician. A member of the Social Democratic Party, he served in the National Council from 1979 to 1988.

Reicht died in Gralla on 4 November 2022, at the age of 94.

References

1928 births
2022 deaths
Members of the National Council (Austria)
Social Democratic Party of Austria politicians
People from Südoststeiermark District